Philostratus or Lucius Flavius Philostratus (c. 170 – 247/250 AD), called "the Athenian", was a Greek sophist of the Roman imperial period. His father was a minor sophist of the same name. He was born probably around 170, and is said by the Suda to have been living in the reign of emperor Philip the Arab (244–249). His death possibly occurred in Tyre c. 250 AD.

Name and identity
Some ambiguity surrounds his name. The name Flavius is given in The Lives of the Sophists and Tzetzes. Eunapius and Synesius call him a Lemnian; Photius a Tyrian; his letters refer to him as an Athenian.

It is probable that he was born in Lemnos, studied and taught at Athens, and then settled in Rome (where he would naturally be called Atheniensis) as a member of the learned circle with which empress Julia Domna surrounded herself.

Works attributed to Philostratus
Historians agree that Philostratus authored at least five works: Life of Apollonius of Tyana (Τὰ ἐς τὸν Τυανέα Ἀπολλώνιον), Lives of the Sophists (Βίοι Σοφιστῶν), Gymnasticus (Γυμναστικός), Heroicus (Ἡρωικός) and Epistolae (Ἐπιστολαί). Another work, Imagines (Εἰκόνες), is usually assigned to his son-in-law Philostratus of Lemnos.

Heroicus (On Heroes, 213–214 AD) is in the form of a dialogue between a Phoenician traveler and a vine-tender or groundskeeper (ἀμπελουργός ampelourgos), regarding Protesilaus (or "Protosilaos"), the first Achaean warrior to be killed at the siege of Troy, as described in the Iliad. The dialogue extends into a discussion and critique of Homer's presentation of heroes and gods, based on the greater authority of the dead Protosileus, who lives after death and communicates with the ampelourgos. Heroicus includes Achilles' "Ode to Echo".<ref>Sophia Papaioannou, Redesigning Achilles: 'Recycling' the Epic Cycle in the 'Little Iliad' (Ovid, Metamorphoses 12.1-13.622). Berlin/New York. Paul, George M. (1982) - 2007 Page 153  "Nagy's article comments on an interesting but little known literary reception of Achilles, namely his representation as a lyric poet and lyre-player, singing a song  to Echo (a code name for the Muse) in the company of Helen of Troy. ... and the two heroes, now souls distanced from their epic lives/roles, have become bards who sing of their own deeds. Cf. Maclean and Aitken above for a translation of the Heroicus, including Achilles' 'Ode to Echo'."</ref>Life of Apollonius of Tyana, written between 217 and 238 AD, tells the story of Apollonius of Tyana (c. 40 – c. 120 AD), a Pythagorean philosopher and teacher. Philostratus wrote the book for Julia Domna, wife of Septimius Severus and mother of Caracalla. The book was completed after her death.Lives of the Sophists, written between 231 and 237 AD, is a semi-biographical history of the Greek sophists. The book is dedicated to a consul Antonius Gordianus, perhaps one of the two Gordians who were killed in 238. The work is divided into two parts: the first dealing with the ancient Sophists, e.g. Gorgias, the second with the later school, e.g. Herodes Atticus. The Lives are not in the true sense biographical, but rather picturesque impressions of leading representatives of an attitude of mind full of curiosity, alert and versatile, but lacking scientific method, preferring the external excellence of style and manner to the solid achievements of serious writing. The philosopher, as he says, investigates truth; the sophist embellishes it, and takes it for granted.Gymnasticus, written after 220 AD, contains accounts concerning the Olympic Games and athletic contests in general.Epistolae, or Love Letters, breathe the spirit of the New Comedy and the Alexandrine poets; portions of Letter 33 are almost literally translated in Ben Jonson's Song to Celia, "Drink to Me Only with Thine Eyes." The letters are mainly of an erotic character. Their publication date is unknown.

Internal evidence confirms that the authors of Life of Apollonius and Lives of the Sophists are one and the same. The Lives of the Sophists was to have an enormous impact upon later writers, particularly Neoplatonists.

Translations
Alciphron, Aelian, and Philostratus, The Letters.  Translated by A. R. Benner, F. H. Fobes. 1949. Loeb Classical Library. 
Philostratus, Lives of the Sophists. Eunapius, Lives of the Philosophers and Sophists. Translated by Wilmer C. Wright. 1921. Loeb Classical Library. 
Philostratus, Apollonius of Tyana. 3 volumes. Translated by Christopher P. Jones. 2005–6. Loeb Classical Library.
Philostratus, Heroicus; Gymnasticus; Discourses 1 and 2. Edited and translated by Jeffrey Rusten and Jason König. Loeb Classical Library. (Cambridge, Massachusetts and London, England, 2014). 
Philostratos, Leben der Sophisten. Greek and German by Kai Brodersen. Wiesbaden: Marix 2014, 
Philostratos, Sport in der Antike (Peri Gymnastikes). Greek and German by Kai Brodersen. Wiesbaden: Marix, 2015, .

Notes

References

Further reading
 Aitken, Ellen Bradshaw, and Jennifer Kay Berenson MacLean, eds. 2004. Philostratus’s “Heroikos”: Religion and Cultural Identity in the Third Century C.E. Atlanta: Society of Biblical Literature.
 Bowie, Ewen L., and Jaś Elsner, eds. 2009. Philostratus. Cambridge, UK: Cambridge Univ. Press.
 Bryson, Norman. 1994. "Philostratus and the Imaginary Museum." In Art and Text in Ancient Greek Culture. Edited by Simon Goldhill and Robin Osborne, 255–283. Cambridge, UK: Cambridge Univ. Press.
 Elsner, Jaś. 2009. "Beyond Compare: Pagan Saint and Christian God in Late Antiquity." Critical Inquiry 35:655–683.
 Eshleman, Kendra Joy. 2008. "Defining the Circle of Sophists: Philostratus and the Construction of the Second Sophistic." Classical Philology 103:395–413.
 Demoen, K., and Danny Praet, eds. 2009. Theios Sophistes: Essays on Flavius Philostratus’ “Vita Apollonii.” Leiden, The Netherlands: Brill.
 Kemezis, Adam M. 2014. Greek Narratives of the Roman Empire under the Severans: Cassius Dio, Philostratus and Herodian. Cambridge, UK: Cambridge Univ. Press.
 König, Jason. 2014. "Images of Elite Communities in Philostratus: Re-Reading the Preface to the “Lives of the Sophists.”" In Roman Rule in Greek and Latin Writing: Double Vision. Edited by Jesper Majbom Madsen and Roger Rees, 246–270. Leiden, The Netherlands: Brill.
 Potter, David. 2011. The Victor’s Crown: A History of Ancient Sport from Homer to Byzantium. Oxford: Oxford Univ. Press.
 Walker, Andrew. 1992. "Eros and the Eye in the Love-Letters of Philostratus." Proceedings of the Cambridge Philological Society 38:132–148.

External links

Livius, Philostratus Updates the subsequent article with some ninety years of more recent research.
Online Text: Philostratus, On Heroes (Heroicus) translated by Ellen Bradshaw Aitken and Jennifer K. Berenson Maclean.  
Online Text: Philostratus, Life of Apollonius of Tyana translated by F. C. Conybeare
Flavius Philostratus entry in historical sourcebook with fresh translations of excerpts from the Life of Apollonius by Mahlon H. Smith
Imagines in National Széchényi Library, Budapest
 
 Flavii Philostrati opera, C. L. Kayser (edit.), 2 voll., Lipsiae, in aedibus B. G. Teubneri, 1870-71:
 Life of Apollonius: vol. 1 pp. 1-344.
Lives of the sophists: vol. 2 pp. 1-127.
Heroicus: vol. 2 pp. 128-219.
Epistolae: vol. 2 pp. 225-260.
Gymnasticus: vol. 2 pp. 261-293.Philostratorum et Callistrati opera, Eunapii vitae sophistarum, Himerii sophistae declamationes'', A. Westermann, Jo. Fr. Boissoade, Fr. Dübner (ed.), Parisiis, editore Ambrosio Firmin Didot, 1849, pp. 1-194 (Life of Apollonius), pp. 195-265 (Lives of the Sophists), pp. 267-319 (Heroicus), pp. 320-338 (Epistolae).

Roman-era Sophists
Roman-era philosophers in Athens
Roman-era Athenian rhetoricians
Flavii

2nd-century Romans

3rd-century Romans
2nd-century Athenians
3rd-century Greek people
People from Lemnos
170s births
250s deaths

Year of birth uncertain
Year of death uncertain